Lake Childress, sometimes Childress Lake, is a lake near Childress, Texas.

Description 
Lake Childress is located 8 miles northwest of Childress, Texas in the Red River Basin. It is a part of the Baylor Creek reservoir which is the pair of Lake Childress and Baylor Lake. Both lakes are owned by the City of Childress. The two lakes have a combined surface area of 650 acres.  The lake is prone to drought causing varying water levels. Due to its high conductivity level, it has been subject to Golden algae kills.

History 
In 1923, the reservoir was constructed on a tributary of Baylor Creek. The intended capacity was 4,600 acres.  The lake was previously used for water supply in Childress, Texas.

Aquatic vegetation 
Lake Childress has coontail, pondweed, flooded trees, cattails, and milfoil.

Fish 
The species of fish at Lake Childress include white crappie, largemouth bass, and catfish.

References 

Lakes of Texas
Geography of Childress County, Texas